Fabio Di Sauro (born December 19, 1975 in Terracina) is a retired Italian professional football player. He last played for Gela.

At first a fullback, he played as a central back in his later career.

Biography
Di Sauro started his career at Internazionale. He was loaned to Serie C1 side Gualdo, then Serie B clubs Reggina and Cremonese. In June 1997, he was about to join Ancona. but left for Fidelis Andria along with Giorgio Frezzolini. The duo also left for Cosenza in 1998. He was also one of the player that sold by Inter to Milan in player exchange, but with inflated nominal transfer fees, made the club gained "false profit" in 2000s (decade). He swapped club with Davide Cordone, made Inter gained €4.6million, but in terms of Cordone's registration rights. In 1999-2000 and 2000–01 season, he was loaned to Arezzo, and met with another AC Milan player Mattia Rinaldini in the 2nd half of 2000–01 season. he then played for Serie C1 clubs and signed by Ancona in summer 2005. In January 2007, he was transferred to Portogruaro in exchange with Gianmario Specchia.

References

External links

1975 births
Living people
People from Terracina
Italian footballers
Serie A players
Serie B players
Inter Milan players
S.S. Fidelis Andria 1928 players
A.S. Gualdo Casacastalda players
Reggina 1914 players
U.S. Cremonese players
Cosenza Calcio 1914 players
S.S. Arezzo players
A.C. Reggiana 1919 players
U.S. Avellino 1912 players
Benevento Calcio players
A.C. Ancona players
Association football defenders
Footballers from Lazio
Sportspeople from the Province of Latina